Mangalorean Catholic names and surnames encompass the different naming conventions of the Mangalorean Catholic community. Historically, many of them had names of Christian saints, while Portuguese-language surnames were most commonly found. A formal Mangalorean Catholic name consists of a given name, a middle name, and a surname.

Mangalorean Catholics use English forms of their names and surnames in English-language contexts and their native language Konkani forms in Konkani-language contexts.

Male given names
Most Mangalorean Catholic names for males follow the second declension. However, if the name ends in e, it follows the first declension, such as Zoze (Joseph). If the name ends in o, it follows the third declension, such as Lorso (Lawrence). The name follows the fourth declension if it ends in i, such as Jākki (Joachim). The fifth declension is observed if the name ends in u, such as Gabru (Gabriel), or if it ends in ãuñ, such as Zuãuñ (John).

Female given names
Mangalorean Catholic female naming conventions differ for married or grown up females and young girls. In case of married or grown up females, most names (more distinctly names ending in a or e) follow the first declension.

Surnames
After the Portuguese possession of Goa in 1510, the Portuguese consolidated their power by imposing their own government and cultural institutions in Goa. They also started spreading Christianity in Goa and converted a large population to Christianity. The Christians adopted Portuguese surnames, customs and traditions. Later due to various religious, political, economic, cultural, social causes such as the religious intolerance of the Goa Inquisition (1560), pressures and attacks from the Marathas in Goa during the late 17th and the early 18th century, food shortages, epidemics, heavy taxation, the Goan Catholics started migrating to safer lands in South Canara, where they were welcomed.

After these Goan migrants settled in South Canara, they came to be known as Mangalorean Catholics, and continued using Portuguese surnames bestowed to their ancestors by the Portuguese. Some families, however, still use their original Goud Saraswat Brahmin surnames such as Nayak, Prabhu, Kamat, Shett, Pai, and Shenoy. These original surnames are actually the names of five classes of persons and originally mean "lord, cultivator, merchant, warrior and writer". To capture their tradition, many have reverted to their original family surnames.  Four of these are Goud Saraswat Brahmin surnames, with the exception of Shett that is used by a few who trace their origins to the Daivadnya Brahmins of Goa. A minuscule percentage descended from local converts still use the surname Padval. These ancestral pre-conversion surnames of the Mangalorean Catholics are called paik in Konkani. Mudartha is a unique Mangalorean Catholic surname to be found among some who hail from the Udupi district.

Presently, Portuguese surnames are also observed in Goan Catholics and East Indian Catholics and some other Christians in India. Portuguese surnames are very popular across the world and significantly found in Portugal, Brazil, Macau, Angola, Cape Verde, East Timor, Equatorial Guinea, Guinea-Bissau, São Tomé and Príncipe and Mozambique.

Bold indicates common surnamesItalics indicates uncommon surnames

Notes

References

.
.
.
.
.

Culture of Mangalore
Names by culture